Longbow 2 is the sequel to the best-selling Jane's AH-64D Longbow from Jane's Combat Simulations, developed by Origin Systems with executive producer Andy Hollis on board, and released by Electronic Arts on November 30, 1997.

Gameplay 

A fully dynamic campaign engine is used to create challenging missions and a random mission generator can be used to create a wide variety of missions. Gameplay is dynamic in the sense that new missions are generated automatically. The game features a command structure, allowing the player to command other helicopters, including OH-58 Kiowa scouts and UH-60 Black Hawk transports. The game's primary campaign features a fictional war between the United States and the Islamic Republic of Iran in which Iranian forces invade nearby Azerbaijan in early to mid 1990s.

Longbow Anthology 
Longbow Anthology was released in 1998 and is a compilation of Jane's AH-64D Longbow, the mission disk Flash Point: Korea (basically, Longbow Gold), and Longbow 2 in one box, with an abbreviated manual. Although compiled into one box, the games are still played as separate games, unlike Fighters Anthology which is all games of that series compiled into one playable game. All included simulators are fully patched to the latest versions.

Reception

In the United States, the game sold 49,397 copies during 1997. Its total sales in the region reached 99,430 copies by October 1999, which drew in revenues of $3.89 million. The Longbow franchise as a whole, including the compilations and Jane's AH-64D Longbow, ultimately shipped above 1.2 million units.

Kenji Takeda of PC Gaming World was positive of the game.

The Academy of Interactive Arts & Sciences nominated Longbow 2 for its "Personal Computer: Simulation Game of the Year" award, but gave the prize to Microsoft Flight Simulator 98. However, Longbow 2 was named the best flight simulation of 1997 by Computer Games Strategy Plus, Computer Gaming World, GameSpot, CNET Gamecenter, PC Gamer US and the Computer Game Developers Conference. It was also a runner-up for Computer Games Strategy Pluss overall game of the year award, but lost to Myth: The Fallen Lords. The editors of Computer Gaming World wrote: "Authentic, exciting, immersive, and graphically dazzling, this is a sim that transcends its genre".

In 1998, PC Gamer declared it the 12th-best computer game ever released, noting its balance between realism and fun, and its campaign model and multi-player support.

See also

Team Apache
Enemy Engaged: Apache vs Havoc

References

External links 
 
 

1997 video games
Combat flight simulators
Longbow 2
Electronic Arts games
Helicopter video games
Origin Systems games
Windows games
Windows-only games
Multiplayer and single-player video games
Video games developed in the United States